is a Japanese composer and musician known for his work on many television dramas, anime series, and movies.

Biography
Kanno was born in Saitama, Japan. He attended junior high school in Kawagoe before later moving to Takanezawa for university. While attending school, he was fascinated by Impressionist Music. He graduated from the Tokyo College of Music, department of composition, film scoring course and started providing music for movies, commercials, and artists while he was still a student. 

On December 14, 2007, Kanno held his first orchestral concert which, according to his website, "started with a strong desire to listen to live music." His first orchestra concert was held at Suntory Hall's Blue Rose in 2007. His first 2-day Valentines concert was held at Bunkamura Orchard Hall in 2014, Yupoto Hall in 2015, Mielparque Hall in 2016, Hitomi Memorial Hall in 2017/2018, and Sakura Hall in 2019, and was well received. He also participated in several collaborations such as 2014 "Yugo Kanno x Junichi Hirokami x Kyoto City Symphony Orchestra", "Yugo Kanno x MOZU Concert", "Gunshi Kanbei Talk & Concert", 2015 "Kizuna Concert", and amongst others. Furthermore, in 2016, "Symphony No. 1 ~ The Border ~" was premiered by Kansai Phil in April 2019. In 2012 he began work as a painter after casually painting a portrait of a friend who came by while he was in the studio.

Under the influence of his father, he grew up listening to jazz and classical music from an early age. He started learning the piano at the age of four, became obsessed with soccer and piano in elementary school, and lived a sensitive boyhood in junior high school, taking charge of percussion instruments in his school's brass band club. After entering high school, he started giving composing lessons and aimed to enter a music college. In 1997, he entered the university of Tokyo College of Music. In 2004, he made his debut at the age of 27 in the Fuji TV drama series "Last Christmas". Since then, he has been active in a wide range of music production such as movies, TV dramas, animations, and documentaries.

In 2010, he won the Japanese Movie Critics Award "Movie Music Artist Award" and the Japan Theater Staff Film Festival Music Award for "Amalfi: Rewards of the Goddess". In May 2014, he won the Monthly Galaxy Award, and in June 2015, he received the Encouragement Award as a composer for a play in the 52nd Galaxy Awards in the TV category.

Discography

Television works

Anime works

Movie works

Game works

Original works

References

External links 

  Yugo Kanno Official Website
  Yugo Kanno Meets Art
  
 Discography at VGMdb
 
 Yugo Kanno's Oficial Twitter Page (@yugokanno)

1977 births
Anime composers
Japanese composers
Japanese film score composers
Japanese male composers
Japanese male film score composers
Japanese music arrangers
Living people
Musicians from Saitama Prefecture
Video game composers
Japanese painters